The 1995 Algarve Cup was the second edition of the Algarve Cup, an invitational women's association football tournament. It took place between 14  and 19 March 1995 in Portugal with Sweden winning the event defeating Denmark, 1-0, in the final game. Norway ended up third defeating the USA, 7-5 following penalty shootout, in the third prize-game.

Format
The number of invited countries was increased from six to eight with Italy and the Netherlands appearing in their first Algarve Cup tournament. 

The eight invited teams were split into two groups that played a round-robin tournament. On completion of this, the fourth placed teams in each group played each other to determine seventh and eighth place, the third placed teams in each group played each other to decide fifth and sixth place, the second placed teams in each group played to determine third and fourth place and the winners of each group would compete for first and second place overall.

Points awarded in the group stage followed the standard formula of three points for a win, one point for a draw and zero points for a loss.

Group A

Group B

Seventh Place

Hosts Portugal again appeared in the play-off for last place, facing newcomers Italy and being defeated 4–1 with two of the Italians' goals being scored in the final two minutes of play.

Fifth Place

The Netherlands finished in sixth place on their first appearance at the Algarve Cup, losing to the 1994 sixth placed team Finland in a penalty shootout.

Third Place

For the second year running, Norway faced the United States in their last game of the tournament. With the score at 3–3 after full-time, a period of sudden death extra-time was played that failed to see another goal. Norway won the following penalty shootout 4–2 to finish third overall in the final tournament standings.

Final

Sweden had played Denmark in the previous year's competition to decide third place and defeated them again on this occasion to finish as overall winners of the tournament.

Awards

Notes

External links
1995 Algarve Cup on RSSSF

1995
1995 in women's association football
1994–95 in Portuguese football
1995 in Swedish women's football
1994–95 in Danish women's football
1995 in Norwegian women's football
1994–95 in Dutch football
1994–95 in Italian football
1995 in American women's soccer
1995 in Finnish football
March 1995 sports events in Europe
1995 in Portuguese women's sport